

The Croses EC-8 Tourisme is a 1960s French three-seat tandem-wing homebuilt aircraft designed by Emilien Croses.

Development
Developed from the earlier two-seat EC-6 Criquet the Tourisme was a three-seat version. Like the Criquet it had a tailwheel landing gear and Mignet-type tandem wing. To equip it for cross-country flying, the EC-8 was fitted with sturdier undercarriage than its predecessor, which consisted of an unusual tandem arrangement of two wheels on each main undercarriage unit.

References

 
 
 

1960s French civil utility aircraft
Homebuilt aircraft
Tourisme
Single-engined tractor aircraft
Tandem-wing aircraft